Prado is a barrio (neighbourhood or district) and a major public park in Montevideo, Uruguay. Together with Nueva Savona, they form the Prado - Nueva Savona composite barrio. Prado is also the name given to all the park areas on both sides of Miguelete Creek, limited by the bridge of Agraciada Avenue over the river to the south and by Millan Avenue to the northeast.

Location
As a barrio, it is a residential neighbourhood of mansions on tree-lined streets built in the early 20th century. It shares borders with Capurro to the southwest, La Teja to the west, Belvedere to the northwest, Paso de las Duranas to the north, Aires Puros to the northeast, Atahualpa to the east and Bella Vista to the south.

In its north end, it extends into Paso de las Duranas, with a northeast extension into Aires Puros, where the Juan Manuel Blanes Museum and the Japanese Garden are located.

The park

The park of Prado, known as Parque Prado is an important venue for the citizens of Montevideo. attractions are Rosedal, a rose garden, fountains, and monuments. Miguelete Creek flows through the park.

Part of the park is the "Rural del Prado", an exposition centre and fairgrounds.

The barrio
The barrio is home to three soccer stadiums, José Nasazzi Park, Federico Saroldi Park, and Alfredo V. Viera Park where the Bella Vista Athletic Club, River Plate Athletic Club, and Montevideo Wanderers soccer teams, respectively, play their games.

The Prado barrio is home to the Carmelitas Church, the Castillo Soneira and many other beautiful old villas.

Places of worship
This neighbourhood is full with Christian temples of very diverse denominations:
 Church of Our Lady of Mt. Carmel and St. Thérèse of Lisieux, popularly known as "Iglesia de los Carmelitas" (Roman Catholic, Carmelites)
 Church of St. Charles Borromeo and Our Lady of the Assumption (Roman Catholic)
 Church of the Immaculate Conception (Roman Catholic)
 Armenian Catholic Cathedral of Our Lady of Bzommar (Armenian Catholic)
 St. Nicholas Greek Orthodox Church (Greek Orthodox)
 St. Paul Lutheran Church (Lutheran)

See also
Barrios of Montevideo

Images

References

External links 

 Intendencia de Montevideo / Paso Molino, El Prado y sus alrededores
Revista Raices / Historia del barrio Prado
Revista Raices / Historia del barrio Paso Molino
Soneira's Castle: Headquarters of San Pablo School Pre University 

 
Barrios of Montevideo